Hong Jong-u (홍종우, 洪鍾宇, 1850 – 1913) was a Korean assassin, reformer, activist and statesman during the Korean Empire. He assassinated Kim Ok-gyun in Shanghai in 1894.

Biography 
Hong Jong-u was born in Ansan circa 1850. His father died in 1886. Afterwards Hong decided to study in France. In Paris the 40-year-old student worked at the Guimet Museum, where he translated the Chunhyangjeon (춘향전; the tale of Chunhyang), Shimcheongjeon (심청전) and the Jikseong haengnyeong pyeonram (직성행녕편람; a Korean fortune-telling book) into French.

In 1893, Hong traveled to Japan where he decided to assassinate Kim Okgyun and Pak Yeong-hyo, two reform-minded Koreans. In 1894, he shot and killed Kim Okgyun aboard ship en route to Shanghai. He later returned to Korea where he was appointed to high office. With the growing influence of Japan over Korean affairs, the anti-Japan Hong Jong-u resigned his official position. He died in 1913.

See also 
 Gapsin Coup
 Kim Ok-gyun
 Yun Chi-ho

1850 births
1913 deaths
People from Gyeonggi Province
Korean assassins
People imprisoned on charges of terrorism
Yun Chi-ho
19th-century Korean people